Congaline is a large village on the Caribbean island of Barbados where the annual Congaline Carnival is held.

Populated places in Barbados